Ithome curvipunctella is a moth in the family Cosmopterigidae. It was described by Walsingham in 1892. It is found in the West Indies (Puerto Rico) and Florida.

The wingspan is about 7 mm for males and 8 mm for females. In Florida, adults have been recorded year round.

The larvae feed on Coccoloba uvifera.

References

Natural History Museum Lepidoptera generic names catalog

Moths described in 1892
Chrysopeleiinae